Willy Geiser (Born 15 November 1903; date of death unknown) was a footballer who played for FC Basel in the 1920s mainly as midfielder but also as striker.

Football career
Geiser joined FC Basel's first team during their 1920–21 season. In this season he played only one friendly match on 29 May 1921 at home in the Landhof as Basel won 6–0 against German team Karlsruher FV. After playing in one more friendly game Geiser played his domestic league debut for the club in the away game on 25 July 1921 as Basel played a 1–1 draw with Biel-Bienne.

Geiser played with the team for three season and during this time he played a total of 26 games for Basel without scoring a goal. 20 of these games were in the Swiss Serie A and six were friendly games.

References

Sources
 Rotblau: Jahrbuch Saison 2017/2018. Publisher: FC Basel Marketing AG. 
 Die ersten 125 Jahre. Publisher: Josef Zindel im Friedrich Reinhardt Verlag, Basel. 
 Verein "Basler Fussballarchiv" Homepage

FC Basel players
Swiss men's footballers
Association football midfielders
Association football forwards
Swiss Super League players
1903 births
Date of death missing